Digital Telecommunications Phils., Inc., commonly known as Digitel, was the second-largest fixed-line and the third-largest mobile telecommunications company in the Philippines. It was also the company that owned Sun Cellular, a mobile phone service.

The company is a subsidiary of PLDT, one of the country's largest conglomerates.

History
Digital Telecommunications Phils., Inc. was established in October 1987 and commenced commercial operations in January 1992.

In 1993, Digitel was awarded a 30-year exclusive contract by the Department of Transportation and Communications (DOTC) to manage, operate, develop and rehabilitate certain telecommunications systems owned by the DOTC (collectively, the "DOTC System") and which are located in the provincial areas of Luzon under a Facilities Management Agreement (FMA). The FMA also provided for its conversion into a lease contract under certain terms and conditions agreed upon by both parties.

In accordance with the provisions of the FMA, Digitel and DOTC agreed to amend and convert the FMA into a Financial Lease Agreement (FLA). Under the FLA, Digitel was granted the exclusive right to lease, manage, maintain, operate, develop and  eventually own the said DOTC facilities.

In February 1994, Digitel was granted a national franchise to provide domestic and international telecommunications services throughout the Philippines. In September 1994, Digitel was granted by the National Telecommunications Commission (NTC) a provisional authority to operate an international gateway facility (IGF). A provisional authority was also secured from the NTC in January 1995 to install, operate, maintain and develop telecommunications facilities in Regions 1 to 5 including the facilities currently leased from DOTC.

Sun Cellular
On August 7, 2000, Digitel was granted by the NTC a Provisional Authority (PA), authorizing it to construct, install, operate and maintain a Nationwide Cellular Mobile Telephone System (CMTS) using Global System for Mobile (GSM) and/or Code Division Multiple Access (CDMA) technology. Consequently, Digitel has been building a high-powered performance GSM/1800 network with a suite of applications and services.

On December 11, 2002, the President of the Philippines, Gloria Macapagal Arroyo signed into law, Republic Act No. 9180 granting Digitel Mobile Philippines Inc. (DMPI), a wholly owned subsidiary of Digitel, a franchise to construct, install, establish, operate and maintain wire and/or wireless telecommunications system throughout the Philippines.

In March 2003, DMPI commercially launched its wireless mobile services under the Sun Cellular brand. It pioneered the 24/7 Call & Text Unlimited in October 2004.

PLDT acquisition and closure
The Philippine Long Distance Telephone Company (PLDT) announced that it has completed the acquisition of Digitel from JG Summit Holdings, Inc. PLDT now owns 51.55 percent equity stake of Digitel. Digitel has a hundred percent stake in Digitel Mobile Philippines, Inc., whose brand name is Sun Cellular.

PLDT will announce a tender offer for all Digitel common stock at the P1.60 per Digitel share, and offered either PLDT shares at P2,500 per share of cash, at the option of Digitel Shareholders. Assuming all of Digitel minority owners agree, the total transaction consideration would be PHP74.1 billion.

After the acquisition and assessment of the Digitel network, The company was announced to delisted from the publicity in the Philippine Stock Exchange (as its stock quoted: DGTL) effectively between from late 2011-2012, and its subscribers were transferred into the PLDT network with its services were shut down. This became effective from November 15 – December 31, 2012, when the last Digitel Business Centers were closed. However, Digitel retained the operation on its subsidiary, Sun Cellular.

Sun Cellular eventually ceased to operate on April 25, 2022, following its integration with PLDT's wireless firm, Smart Communications.

Products
Digitel's fixed line services are offered under the Mango, Choice, and DigiFonePal brands. Its cellular service is sold under the Sun Cellular brand, while its broadband Internet services are sold under the Mango and NetVantage DSL brands.

Subsidiaries
Digitel Mobile Philippines, Inc.
Digitel Capital Philippines Ltd. 
Digitel Information Technology Services, Inc.
 Asia Netcom Philippines Corporation (60%)  
 Digital Crossing, Inc. (40%)

References

External links
Digital Telecommunications Philippines

PLDT subsidiaries
Telecommunications companies of the Philippines
Telecommunications companies established in 1987
Companies based in Quezon City
Former JG Summit Holdings subsidiaries